Anders Nielsen (born 4 March 1974), known professionally as Anders Kjølholm, is a Danish bassist, best known as the former bassist of the Danish heavy metal band Volbeat. Before Volbeat, he was the bassist in Dominus, which also featured Volbeat founding member Michael Poulsen. He primarily uses Ernie Ball Music Man StingRay basses, but is also seen playing a black Fender Jazz Bass and uses TC Electronic amps.

Anders is primarily known for his prolific stage presence during performances. He is well known for antics with crowds and is often seen on all parts of the stage interacting with fans.

In November 2015 the band announced that Kjølholm would leave Volbeat. They emphasized, that he left in good terms with the band. Poulsen and Larsen said that "Anders has been a loyal friend and bandmate since 2001.  [...] We’re very thankful for this and wish Anders all the best in the future." Kjøholm likewise wished all the best for the rest of the band.

In 2020 he became a member of the hard rock band Ace it Moe.

Discography

With Volbeat 
 2005: The Strength/The Sound/The Songs
 2007: Rock the Rebel/Metal the Devil
 2008: Guitar Gangsters & Cadillac Blood
 2010: Beyond Hell/Above Heaven
 2013: Outlaw Gentlemen & Shady Ladies

References

Living people
1971 births
Danish bass guitarists
Male bass guitarists
Volbeat members
21st-century bass guitarists